Frederick Andrew Inderwick KC (23 April 1836 – 16 August 1904) was an English lawyer, antiquarian, and Liberal Party politician who sat in the House of Commons from 1880 to 1885. As a barrister he mainly took divorce cases, which at the time was thought to have impeded his progress to judge.

Early life

Frederick Andrew Inderwick was born in London, the son of Capt. Andrew Inderwick R.N. and his wife Jane Hudson, daughter of Joseph Hudson. He was educated privately in Leicestershire and was admitted to Trinity College, Cambridge in 1851.

Career
Inderwick was admitted at the Inner Temple in 1855 and called to the Bar 26 January 1858. He went on the South Eastern Circuit and practised in the probate and divorce courts.

Inderwick stood unsuccessfully for parliament at Cirencester in 1868 and at Dover in 1874. In 1874, he became Q.C. and in 1877 a Bencher of his Inn. He was a J.P.

Henry Edwin Fenn claimed in Thirty-five years in the divorce court (1910) that Inderwick was always passed over for a judgeship on the grounds that it was not the practice in England to promote to the bench any lawyer whose practice had been mainly in the divorce courts.

At the 1880 general election Inderwick was elected Member of Parliament for Rye. He held the seat until 1885. He was Mayor of Winchelsea, Sussex in 1892-93 and 1902–03, when he was one of the representatives of the Cinque Ports at the coronation of King Edward VII. He was also a Commissioner in Lunacy in 1903–4. He was elected a Fellow of the Society of Antiquarians in 1894 and was an author on political and legal history.

Family
Inderwick married Frances Maria Wilkinson, daughter of John Wilkinson of the Exchequer and Audit Department on 4 August 1857, and had issue.

Death
Inderwick died in Edinburgh at the age of 68.

Selected publications
The Interregnum, A.D. 1648-1660: studies of the Commonwealth, legislative, social, and legal. S. Low, Marston, Searle & Rivington. London, 1891.
The king's peace: a historical sketch of the English law courts. Swan Sonnenschein, London, 1895.

References

External links

1836 births
1904 deaths
Liberal Party (UK) MPs for English constituencies
UK MPs 1880–1885
Alumni of Trinity College, Cambridge
Members of the Inner Temple
Mayors of Winchelsea
Lawyers from London
Fellows of the Society of Antiquaries of London